Deir Khabiyah is a Syrian village located in Markaz Rif Dimashq, Rif Dimashq. According to the Syria Central Bureau of Statistics (CBS), Deir Khabiyah had a population of 4,350 in the 2004 census.

History
The tell in Deir Khabiyah dates back to the Bronze Age and Iron Age from the beginning of the 2nd to the 1st millennium BC.

In 1838, Eli Smith noted Deir Khabiyah's population being Sunni Muslims.

Syrian Civil War

On 16 May 2022, two fighters of the Pro-Assad Ba'ath militia were killed in a double IED explosion in the village.

References

Bibliography

 

Populated places in Markaz Rif Dimashq District